The English International School is a private co-educational day school in Cotonou, Benin that was founded in 2000. It provides an international education using the English language as the language of instruction for pupils aged 3–18 years. It is one of over 10,000 school established in over 160 countries that offer Cambridge International Examinations (CIE).

Students enrolled at the school, dependent on age, follow either the Cambridge Primary Programme assessed through Cambridge Primary Checkpoint, the Cambridge Secondary 1 Programme assessed through Cambridge Secondary 1 Checkpoint, the Cambridge Secondary 2 Programme assessed through CIE IGCSE examinations or the Cambridge Advanced Programme which is assessed through CIE A and AS level examinations.

References

External links
Official Website
Cambridge International Examinations

Educational institutions established in 2000
International schools in Benin
Cambridge schools in Benin
Cotonou
2000 establishments in Benin